Marat Nailevich Izmailov (born 21 September 1982) is a Russian former professional footballer.

Mainly a right midfielder, he could also appear as an attacking midfielder, being best known for his dribbling skills and pace while also possessing a good long-distance shot and accurate passing. He played most of his injury-plagued career with Sporting CP, after starting it with Lokomotiv Moscow.

Izmailov represented Russia at the 2002 World Cup and two European Championships, earning 35 caps in 11 years.

Club career

Lokomotiv
Born in Moscow of Volga Tatar descent, Izmailov emerged through local FC Lokomotiv Moscow's youth ranks, making a lightning progression in a period of six months. He was already a very important first-team member when Lokomotiv won the Russian Premier League titles in 2002 and 2004, and the player received the 2001 award for Best Young Player. However, early on, he also often suffered with injuries.

On 24 October 2001, Izmailov was one of the players who helped crush R.S.C. Anderlecht in Brussels, for the season's UEFA Champions League (5–1).

Sporting
In July 2007, Izmailov was loaned for one season to Sporting CP, making his official debut in the Supertaça Cândido de Oliveira on 11 August, against FC Porto in Leiria. The game ended 1–0, with the game's only goal being scored by him at the 75th minute, with a long-distance effort; he also played that match with an injury.

On 6 October 2007, coming from the bench, Izmailov contributed with two late goals (his first league ones) in a 3–0 home win against Vitória de Guimarães, and eventually helped the side finish second in the Primeira Liga, adding the Taça de Portugal also against Porto. During the following summer he signed a permanent deal with the Lisbon-based club, which paid Lokomotiv €4.5 million.

In 2009–10, Izmailov's physical problems resurfaced, and he would spend more than three months in the sidelines with a knee condition. He returned to training following coach Paulo Bento's dismissal, in late November 2009, but spent most of the following years on the sidelines nursing the same injury, and quarreling with Sporting's board of directors over the issue.

Porto

On 7 January 2013, after passing the pertinent medicals, Izmailov joined Porto on a two-and-a-half-year contract, with Miguel Lopes moving in the opposite direction. He changed his jersey name from Izmailov to Izmaylov, and scored in only his second match, helping to a 2–0 home win over F.C. Paços de Ferreira.

On 31 January 2014, after spending four months in his country due to family reasons, Izmailov signed for Gabala FK in the Azerbaijan Premier League on loan until the end of the season, rejoining former Lokomotiv coach Yuri Semin who he worked with nine years ago. On 16 July he returned to his homeland and signed on loan for FC Krasnodar, which had the option of making the move permanent at the end of the campaign.

Izmailov scored his first goal in Russian football in seven years on 14 August 2014, netting his team's first in a 4–0 home win against FC Spartak Moscow. He left Porto at the end of his contract, in July 2015.

Krasnodar
On 20 July 2016, after one year out of football, 33-year-old Izmailov signed a one-year contract with Krasnodar with an extension option. On 15 March 2017, he and club parted ways by mutual consent.

Ararat Moscow
On 9 June 2017, Izmailov joined Russian Professional Football League club FC Ararat Moscow, where he shared teams with fellow former internationals Roman Pavlyuchenko and Aleksei Rebko. On 26 September, his contract was dissolved by mutual consent.

International career
Izmailov made his debut with Russia aged just 19, and was summoned for the squads at the 2002 FIFA World Cup and UEFA Euro 2004, playing twice in each of those tournaments. On 25 May 2012, after an absence of six years, he was selected by manager Dick Advocaat for his Euro 2012 squad.

Career statistics

Club

International

Scores and results list Russia's goal tally first, score column indicates score after each Izmailov goal.

Honours

Club
Lokomotiv
Russian Premier League: 2002, 2004
Russian Cup: 2000–01, 2006–07
Russian Super Cup: 2003, 2005
CIS Cup: 2005

Sporting
Taça de Portugal: 2007–08; Runner-up 2011–12
Supertaça Cândido de Oliveira: 2007, 2008
Taça da Liga: Runner-up 2007–08, 2008–09

Porto
Primeira Liga: 2012–13
Taça da Liga: Runner-up 2012–13

Gabala
Azerbaijan Cup: Runner-up 2013–14

Individual
Russian Premier League: Best Young Player 2001

References

External links

1982 births
Living people
Tatar people of Russia
Footballers from Moscow
Tatar sportspeople
Russian footballers
Association football midfielders
Russian Premier League players
FC Lokomotiv Moscow players
FC Krasnodar players
Primeira Liga players
Sporting CP footballers
FC Porto players
Azerbaijan Premier League players
Gabala FC players
Russia under-21 international footballers
Russia international footballers
2002 FIFA World Cup players
UEFA Euro 2004 players
UEFA Euro 2012 players
Russian expatriate footballers
Expatriate footballers in Portugal
Expatriate footballers in Azerbaijan
Russian expatriate sportspeople in Portugal
Russian expatriate sportspeople in Azerbaijan
FC Ararat Moscow players